King of Trios was a three-night tournament promoted by the Chikara professional wrestling promotion. The tournament was a different take on the Tag World Grand Prix event that the promotion was known for annually promoting; in King of Trios, instead of tag teams, there were trios that competed in six-man tag team matches to see who would advance. The tournament served as the promotion's premier event, similar to what WrestleMania is for the WWE.

List of winners

2007

All in all, sixteen trios competed in the tournament, making for a total of forty-eight competitors. The tournament marked the 2007 season premiere of the promotion. The three nights of the 2007 tournament took place on February 16, 2007 in Hellertown, Pennsylvania, February 17 in Barnesville, Pennsylvania, and February 18 in Philadelphia, Pennsylvania. Nobutaka Moribe was originally scheduled to be a part of Team DDT, but had to be replaced by Masamune, after getting stuck in traffic.

Teams
BLKOUT (Joker, Ruckus and Sabian)
The Colony (Fire Ant, Soldier Ant and Worker Ant [I])
Hallowicked and Up in Smoke (Cheech and Cloudy)
The Iron Saints (Brandon Thomaselli, Sal Thomaselli and Vito Thomaselli)
The Kings of Wrestling (Chuck Taylor, Gran Akuma and Icarus)
Larry Sweeney, Mitch Ryder and Robbie Ellis
Los Ice Creams (El Hijo del Ice Cream, Ice Cream, Jr. and Very Mysterious Ice Cream)
Mike Quackenbush and ShaneSaw (Jigsaw and Shane Storm)
The Order of the Neo–Solar Temple (Crossbones, Hydra and UltraMantis Black)
Team DDT (American Balloon, Danshoku Dino and Masamune)
Team IWS (Jagged, Max Boyer and Shane Matthews)
Team Kaientai Dojo (Kudo, Miyawaki and Yoshiaki Yago)
Team Mucha Lucha (Lince Dorado, El Pantera and Sicodelico, Jr.)
Team PWG (Chris Bosh, Joey Ryan and Scott Lost)
Team TNA (Alex Shelley, Chris Sabin and Sonjay Dutt)
Team USA (Jay Jaillet, The Patriot and USApe)

Tournament bracket

2008

The 2008 King of Trios Tournament was held February 29, and March 1 and 2, 2008 at the New Alhambra Arena in Philadelphia, Pennsylvania. The tournament featured 28 teams, up from the 16 of 2007. Team Dr. Keith was originally scheduled to comprise Brodie Lee and the Olsen Twins (Colin Olsen and Jimmy Olsen), but Colin was forced to pull out of the event after signing a contract with World Wrestling Entertainment. His replacement was decided by a random draw. Los Ice Creams' third partner was decided in similar fashion.

Teams
BLKOUT (Eddie Kingston, Joker and Ruckus)
The Cold Front (Glacier and Los Ice Creams (El Hijo del Ice Cream and Ice Cream, Jr.))
The Colony (Fire Ant, Soldier Ant and Worker Ant [I])
The F1rst Family (Arik Cannon, Darin Corbin and Ryan Cruz)
The Fabulous Three (Larry Sweeney, Mitch Ryder and Shayne Hawke)
F.I.S.T. (Chuck Taylor, Gran Akuma and Icarus)
The Golden Trio (Delirious, Hallowicked and Helios)
Kaiju's Sea Amigos (Call-Me-Kevin, D.W. Cycloptopuss III and Unibouzu)
Las Chivas Rayadas (Chiva II, Chiva III and Chiva IV)
Los Luchadores de Mexico (Incognito, Lince Dorado and El Pantera)
Mike Quackenbush, Shane Storm and Skayde
The Naptown Dragons (Dustin Lee, Drake Younger and Scotty Vortekz)
The Order of the Neo–Solar Temple (Crossbones, Hydra and UltraMantis Black)
Da Soul Touchaz (Acid Jaz, Marshe Rockett and Willie Richardson)
The Southern Saints (Marcus O'Neil, Reno Diamond and Shawn Reed)
Sweet n' Sour Inc. (Bobby Dempsey, Sara Del Rey and Tank Toland)
Team AZW (AkuA, Immortal Black and Immortal White)
Team BSE (Kobra Kai, La Sombra Canadiense and Super Xtremo)
Team DDT (Kudo, Miyawaki and Susumu)
Team Dr. Keith (Brodie Lee, Jimmy Olsen and Retail Dragon)
Team Egypt (The Osirian Portal (Amasis and Ophidian) and MECHA Mummy)
Team El Dorado (Go, Michael Nakazawa and Mototsugu Shimizu)
Team IPW:UK (Martin Stone, Sha Samuels and Terry Frazier)
Team IWS (El Generico, Player Uno and Stupefied)
Team ROH (Alex Payne, Rhett Titus and Shane Hagadorn)
Team Stranglehold (Andy Sumner, Drew Gulak and Tim Donst)
Team WTF (Cheech, Cloudy and m.c.KZ)
Team WWF (One Man Gang and Demolition (Ax and Smash))

Tournament bracket

2009

The 2009 King of Trios tournament took place over March 27, 28 and 29 at The Arena in Philadelphia, Pennsylvania. This tournament had 16 teams due to the financial troubles of last year (down from the 28 of last year). The Cold Front was originally scheduled to comprise Al Snow, Iceberg and Glacier, but Iceberg could not make it to the show and was replaced by a random draw.

Teams
The Cold Front 2.0 (Al Snow, D'Lo Brown and Glacier)
The Death Match Kings (Brain Damage, Necro Butcher and Toby Klein)
The F1rst Family (Arik Cannon, Darin Corbin and Ryan Cruz)
F.I.S.T. (Chuck Taylor, Gran Akuma and Icarus)
The Future is Now (Helios, Equinox and Lince Dorado)
Incoherence (Delirious, Frightmare and Hallowicked)
The Masters of a Thousand Holds (Jorge "Skayde" Rivera, Johnny Saint and Mike Quackenbush)
The Osirian Portal (Amasis, Escorpion Egipcio and Ophidian)
The Roughnecks (Brodie Lee, Eddie Kingston and Grizzly Redwood)
Da Soul Touchaz (Marshe Rockett, Trauma and Willie Richardson)
Team CZW (Beef Wellington, Greg Excellent and Pinkie Sanchez)
Team DDT (Kota Ibushi, Kudo and Michael Nakazawa)
Team Epic War (Austin Aries, Ryan Drago and Tony Kozina)
Team PWG (El Generico, Matt Jackson and Nick Jackson)
Team Uppercut (Bryan Danielson, Claudio Castagnoli and Dave Taylor)
The UnStable (Colin Delaney, Stigma and Vin Gerard)

Tournament bracket

2010

The 2010 King of Trios tournament took place April 23, 24 and 25 at The Arena in Philadelphia, Pennsylvania. Like the previous year, 16 teams entered the tournament. The team of Aeroform and Johnny Gargano earned the final spot in the tournament by winning Absolute Intense Wrestling's 16-team Jack of All Trios tournament, held on April 9 and 10. Team Delicioso was originally scheduled to consist of Cassandro, El Hijo del Ice Cream and Ice Cream, Jr., but Cassandro was forced to withdraw from the tournament, after breaking his leg at Ring of Honor's The Big Bang! pay-per-view on April 3. He announced on a blog on Chikara's official website that he had hand-picked his replacement as opposed to letting it be decided by a random draw. On April 9 Curry Man was revealed as the replacement. Originally Team Mexico (Jorge "Skayde" Rivera, Turbo and Valiente) was scheduled to enter the tournament, but on April 22 the company announced that both Valiente and Turbo were off the event and that as a result they were severing all ties with Rivera, who was in charge of bringing the two to the event and who reportedly tried to hold the company up for more money, despite failing to deliver Valiente and Turbo, who had already taken bookings elsewhere for the weekend. Their replacement trio, who ended up being the team of The Osirian Portal (Amasis and Ophidian) and Sara Del Rey, was decided at the event by a random draw.

Teams
Bruderschaft des Kreuzes (Ares, Claudio Castagnoli and Tursas)
Bruderschaft des Kreuzes (Lince Dorado, Pinkie Sanchez and Tim Donst)
The Colony (Fire Ant, Green Ant [I] and Soldier Ant)
The F1rst Family (Arik Cannon, Darin Corbin and Ryan Cruz)
F.I.S.T. (Chuck Taylor, Gran Akuma and Icarus)
The Future is Now (Equinox, Helios and Jigsaw)
The Jackson 3 (Malachi Jackson, Matt Jackson and Nick Jackson)
The Osirian Portal (Amasis and Ophidian) and Sara Del Rey
Team Big Japan Wrestling (Daisuke Sekimoto, Kankuro Hoshino and Yuji Okabayashi)
Team Delicioso (Curry Man, El Hijo del Ice Cream and Ice Cream, Jr.)
Team Frightning (Frightmare, Hallowicked and Mike Quackenbush)
Team Oreo (Flip Kendrick, Louis Lyndon and Johnny Gargano)
Team Osaka Pro (Atsushi Kotoge, Daisuke Harada and Tadasuke)
Team Perros del Mal (El Alebrije, Cuije and El Oriental)
The Throwbacks (Dasher Hatfield, Matt Classic and Sugar Dunkerton)
The UnStable (Colin Delaney, Stigma and Vin Gerard)

Tournament bracket

2011

The 2011 King of Trios tournament took place April 15, 16 and 17 at the Asylum Arena in Philadelphia, Pennsylvania. As in the two previous years, 16 teams entered the tournament. The tournament marked the first time all scheduled participants were able to make it to the shows. The tournament was dedicated to the memory of Chikara Wrestle Factory graduate Alex Whybrow, better known as Larry Sweeney, who died on April 11, 2011. The whole tournament was released on DVD by Smart Mark Video on April 18, less than 24 hours after its conclusion.

Teams
¡3.0lé! (El Generico, Scott Parker and Shane Matthews)
Amazing Red and The Maximos (Joel Maximo and Wil Maximo)
The Batiri (Kodama and Obariyon) and Sinn Bodhi
Bruderschaft des Kreuzes (Delirious, Jakob Hammermeier and Tim Donst)
The Colony (Fire Ant, Green Ant [I] and Soldier Ant)
Da Soul Touchaz (Acid Jaz, Marshe Rockett and Willie Richardson)
F.I.S.T. (Chuck Taylor, Icarus and Johnny Gargano)
Jigsaw, Manami Toyota and Mike Quackenbush
The Osirian Portal (Amasis, Hieracon and Ophidian)
The Spectral Envoy (Frightmare, Hallowicked and UltraMantis Black)
Team Australia (Kabel, Percy T and Tama Williams)
Team Dragon Gate (Akira Tozawa, Kagetora and Super Shisa)
Team Michinoku Pro (Dick Togo, Great Sasuke and Jinsei Shinzaki)
Team Minnesota (1–2–3 Kid, Arik Cannon and Darin Corbin)
Team Osaka Pro (Atsushi Kotoge, Daisuke Harada and Ultimate Spider Jr.)
The Throwbacks (Dasher Hatfield, Matt Classic and Sugar Dunkerton)

Tournament bracket

2012

The 2012 King of Trios tournament took place September 14, 15 and 16 in Easton, Pennsylvania. The tournament featured the first ever all-female trios, representing the Japanese JWP Joshi Puroresu and Sendai Girls' Pro Wrestling promotions. Submission Squad (Davey Vega, Evan Gelistico, Gary Jay and Pierre Abernathy) was originally scheduled to become the first quartet in the history of King of Trios, but were unable to make the event due to "travel issues". They were replaced by the team of Mihara, The Mysterious and Handsome Stranger and Tito Santana, a team decided supposedly by a random draw. Submission Squad did however show up later that night and attempted to force their way into the arena. They were subsequently turned away and thrown out.

Teams
The Batiri (Kobald, Kodama and Obariyon)
The Colony (AassailANT, Fire Ant and Green Ant [I])
The Extreme Trio (Jerry Lynn, Tommy Dreamer and Too Cold Scorpio)
The Faces of Pain (The Barbarian, Meng and The Warlord)
F.I.S.T. (Chuck Taylor, Icarus and Johnny Gargano)
Gran Akuma and 3.0 (Scott Parker and Shane Matthews)
Jigsaw, Manami Toyota and Mike Quackenbush
Mihara, The Mysterious and Handsome Stranger and Tito Santana
The Spectral Envoy (Frightmare, Hallowicked and UltraMantis Black)
The Swarm (CombatANT, DeviANT and Soldier Ant)
Team JWP (Command Bolshoi, Kaori Yoneyama and Tsubasa Kuragaki)
Team Osaka Pro (Ebessan, Kikutaro and Takoyakida)
Team Ring of Honor (Matt Jackson, Mike Bennett and Nick Jackson)
Team Sendai Girls (Dash Chisako, Meiko Satomura and Sendai Sachiko)
Team WWF (1–2–3 Kid, Aldo Montoya and Tatanka)
The Throwbacks (Dasher Hatfield, Mark Angelosetti and Matt Classic)

Tournament bracket

2014

The 2014 King of Trios tournament took place September 19, 20 and 21 in Easton, Pennsylvania. The streams of each night were available on demand 10 hours after the conclusion of each. On September 23, the entire tournament was released on Blu-ray for the first time.

Teams
3peck0 (Archibald Peck, Scott Parker and Shane Matthews)
BDK3 (Ares, Doctor Cube and Nøkken)
The Bloc Party (Mr. Azerbaijan, Prakash Sabar and The Proletariat Boar of Moldova)
The Colony (Fire Ant, Silver Ant and Worker Ant [II])
The Colony: Xtreme Force (Arctic Rescue Ant, Missile Assault Ant and Orbit Adventure Ant)
The Devastation Corporation (Blaster McMassive, Flex Rumblecrunch and Max Smashmaster)
The Flood (Eddie Kingston, Jimmy Jacobs and Volgar)
Gekido (17, Jigsaw and The Shard)
The Golden Trio (Dasher Hatfield, Icarus and Mark Angelosetti)
KE4TPG (Jolly Roger, Lance Steel and Princess KimberLee)
Kizarny & his Odditorium (Qefka the Quiet, Sinn Bodhi and Sir Oliver Grimsly)
LAX (Chavo Guerrero Jr., Hernandez and Homicide)
The Spectral Envoy (Frightmare, Hallowicked and UltraMantis Black)
The Spirit Squad (Johnny, Kenny and Mikey)
Team Extravaganza (Jervis Cottonbelly, Marion Fontaine and ThunderKitty)
Team UK (Damian Dunne, Mark Andrews and Pete Dunne)

Tournament bracket

2015
The 2015 King of Trios tournament took place September 4, 5 and 6 in Easton, Pennsylvania. MK McKinnan was originally announced for the tournament as part of Team Fight Club: Pro, but was on August 25 replaced by Daniel Moloney.

Teams
Arcane Horde (Kodama, Obariyon and Oleg the Usurper)
Battleborn (Kevin Condron, Lucas Calhoun and Missile Assault Man)
Battle Hive (Amasis, Fire Ant and Worker Ant [II])
Bruderschaft des Kreuzes (Jakob Hammermeier, Nøkken and Soldier Ant)
The Bullet Club (A.J. Styles, Matt Jackson and Nick Jackson)
Crown & Court (El Hijo del Ice Cream, Ice Cream Jr. and Princess KimberLee)
Dasher's Dugout (Dasher Hatfield, Icarus and Mark Angelosetti)
Devastation Corporation (Blaster McMassive, Flex Rumblecrunch and Max Smashmaster)
The Gentleman's Club (Chuck Taylor, Drew Gulak and the Swamp Monster)
Nightmare Warriors (Frightmare, Hallowicked and Silver Ant)
Snake Pit (Eddie Kingston, Ophidian and Shynron)
Team AAA (Aero Star, Drago and Fénix)
Team Attack! (Mark Andrews, Morgan Webster and Pete Dunne)
Team bWo (Big Stevie Cool, Da Blue Guy and Hollywood Nova)
Team Fight Club: Pro (Daniel Moloney, Trent Seven and Tyler Bate)
United Nations (Juan Francisco de Coronado, Mr. Azerbaijan and The Proletariat Boar of Moldova)

Tournament bracket

2016
The 2016 King of Trios tournament took place September 2, 3 and 4 in Easton, Pennsylvania. Madison Eagles was originally announced as part of Team Shimmer, but had to drop out due to an injury. Her spot was taken by Solo Darling. The Big Deal was originally announced for the tournament as part of Team Big Deal alongside Rick Roland and Sloan Caprice, but was also forced to pull out due to an injury. They were replaced by The Submission Squad.

Teams
The Batiri (Kobald, Kodama and Obariyon)
The Colony (Fire Ant, Silver Ant and Soldier Ant)
Heidi Lovelace and N_R_G (Hype Rockwell and Race Jaxon)
The HeXed Men (Hallowicked, Icarus and Jigsaw)
Just a Lot of Ants (Bullet Ant, Missile Assault Man and Worker Ant [II])
Major League Moustache (Dasher Hatfield, Trent Seven and Tyler Bate)
The Snake Pit (Amasis, Argus and Ophidian)
The Submission Squad (Davey Vega, Gary Jay and Pierre Abernathy)
Team #CWC (Cedric Alexander, Drew Gulak and Johnny Gargano)
Team JWP (Command Bolshoi, Hanako Nakamori and Manami Katsu)
Team Original Divas Revolution (Jazz, Mickie James and Victoria)
Team Police Squad (Detective Bill Carr, Officer Warren Barksdale and Supercop Dick Justice)
Team Sendai Girls (Cassandra Miyagi, Dash Chisako and Meiko Satomura)
Team Shimmer (Candice LeRae, Crazy Mary Dobson and Solo Darling)
United Nations (Juan Francisco de Coronado, Prakash Sabar and The Proletariat Boar of Moldova)
The Warriors Three (Oleg the Usurper, Princess KimberLee and ThunderFrog)

Tournament bracket

2017

The 2017 King of Trios tournament took place on September 1, 2 and 3 in Wolverhampton, England. Originally announced in February 2017 as taking place in Birmingham, the tournament was moved to the larger venue in June.

Teams
Casa Dorada (Juan Francisco de Coronado, Cornelius Crummels and Sonny Defarge)
House Attack (Chief Deputy Dunne, Jim Obstruction and Lee Obstruction)
House Bike Cops (Donald Kluger, Jasper Tippins and Officer Warren Barksdale)
House Bodyslam (Emeritus, Michael Fynne and Vasyl)
House Calamari (Chris Brookes, Elijah and Kid Lykos)
House Fight Club (Kyle Fletcher, Millie McKenzie and Omari)
House Furies (Fire Ant, Solo Darling and Travis Huckabee)
House Revival (Jody Fleisch, Johnny Moss and Jonny Storm)
House Rot (Frightmare, Hallowicked and Kobald)
House Sendai Girls (Cassandra Miyagi, Dash Chisako and Meiko Satomura)
House Seven Seas (Cajun Crawdad, Hermit Crab and Merlok)
House of Sport (Danny Boy Collins, James Mason and Mal Sanders)
House Strong Style (Pete Dunne, Trent Seven and Tyler Bate)
House Throwbacks (Dasher Hatfield, Mark Angelosetti and Simon Grimm)
House WhiteWolf (A-Kid, Adam Chase and Zayas)
House Xyberhawx (Nytehawk, Razerhawk and Sylverhawk)

Tournament bracket

2018
The 2018 King of Trios tournament took place on August 31, September 1 and 2 in Easton, Pennsylvania.

Teams
Ancient Order of the Nations (Mick Moretti, Jack Bonza, and Adam Hoffman)
Dark Lords of the Proteus (Volgar, Callux, and Frantik)
The F.I.S.T. Order (Icarus, Travis Huckabee, and Tony Deppen)
Galactic Wildlife Commission (ThunderFrog, Air Wolf, and Wildcat)
The Millennium Throwbacks (Dasher Hatfield, Mark Angelosetti, and Boomer Hatfield)
The New Republic (El Hijo del Ice Cream, Ice Cream, Jr, and Kikutaro)
The Nexus Alliance (P. J. Black, Michael Tarver, and Fred Rosser)
The Ohnaka Gang (Rey Bucanero, Pierre Carl Ouellet, and Katarina Leigh)
Raiders of the Beyond (Chris Dickinson, Cam Zagami, and Brian Milonas)
The Regime (Juan Francisco de Coronado, Rick Roland, and Sloan Caprice)
The ResistANTce (Fire Ant, Green Ant [II], and Thief Ant)
The Shimmer Collective (Madison Eagles, Shazza McKenzie, and Jessica Troy)
Sisters of the Mighty (Solo Darling, Molly Holly, and Aja Perera)
Society of the Deep (Merlok, Hermit Crab, and Cajun Crawdad)
Tokyo Joshi Freedom Fighters (Miyu Yamashita, Yuka Sakazaki, and Shoko Nakajima)
Xyberhawx Techno Union (Razerhawk, Nytehawk, and Danjerhawk)

Tournament bracket

2019
The 2019 King of Trios tournament took place on October 4, 5 and 6 in Reading, Pennsylvania.

Teams
The Carnies (Nick Iggy, Kerry Awful, and Tripp Cassidy)
The Colony (Fire Ant, Green Ant [II], and Thief Ant)
The Creatures of the Deep (Oceanea, Merlok, and Hermit Crab)
The Crucible (Ophidian, Princess KimberLee, and Lance Steel)
The Crucible (Devantes, Matt Makowski, and E.M. DeMorest)
The Embassy (Prince Nana, Jimmy Rave, and Sal Rinauro)
F.I.S.T. (Icarus, Travis Huckabee, and Tony Deppen)
Hatfields & McCoy (Dasher Hatfield, Boomer Hatfield, and Molly McCoy)
Karate Kat Xtreme (Lucas Calhoun, Missile Assault Man, and Stray Kat)
The Legion of Rot (Hallowicked, Frightmare, and Kobald)
The Nations (Mick Moretti, Jack Bonza, and Adam Hoffman)
Quack Attack (Mike Quackenbush, Lance Lude, and Rob Killjoy)
Queens (Solo Darling, Willow Nightingale, and Freddie Mercurio)
Team Nerder Death Kris (Nick Gage, Thomas Santell, and Kris Statlander)
Team Pump (Scott Steiner, Petey Williams, and Jordynne Grace)
VeloCities (Paris De Silva, Jude London, and Mat Diamond) 

Tournament bracket

References

External links
Chikara official website
DVD Location

Chikara (professional wrestling) shows
Recurring events established in 2007
Tag team tournaments